The 2009 FIM Speedway World Cup (SWC) was the ninth FIM Speedway World Cup season. The final took place on 19 July 2009 in Leszno, Poland. The defending World Champions were Denmark who won the 2008 final in Vojens, Denmark. It was the fourth final to be held in Poland, and the second in the Alfred Smoczyk Stadium after the 2007 final was held there when Poland beat Denmark, Australia and Great Britain. Poland won the 2009 Speedway World Cup.

Qualification

Qualified teams

Venues

Squads

Squads for the 2009 Speedway World Cup consisted of 10 riders; the same as the previous tournament in 2008. Each participating national association had to confirm its 10-riders one month before the first tournament meeting.

Tournament

Final classification

See also
 2009 Speedway Grand Prix
 2009 Team Speedway Junior World Championship

References

External links
 SpeedwayWorld.tv (SWC news)

 
World Team
2009